Inverness, Alabama, may refer to one of the two following locations:

Inverness, Bullock County, Alabama
Inverness, Shelby County, Alabama